Orenstein & Koppel (normally abbreviated to "O&K") was a major German engineering company specialising in railway vehicles, escalators, and heavy equipment. It was founded on April 1, 1876, in Berlin by Benno Orenstein and Arthur Koppel.

Originally a general engineering company, O&K soon started to specialise in the manufacture of railway vehicles. The company also manufactured heavy equipment and escalators. O&K pulled out of the railway business in 1981. Its escalator-manufacturing division was spun off to the company's majority shareholder at the time, Friedrich Krupp AG Hoesch-Krupp, in 1996, leaving the company to focus primarily on construction machines. The construction-equipment business was sold to New Holland Construction, at the time part of the Fiat Group, in 1999.

Founding and railway work

The Orenstein & Koppel Company was a mechanical-engineering firm that first entered the railway-construction field, building locomotives and other railroad cars.

First founded in 1892 in Schlachtensee, in the Zehlendorf district of Berlin, and known as the Märkische Lokomotivfabrik, the O&K factories expanded to supply the Imperial German Army under Kaiser Wilhelm II with field-service locomotives, or Feldbahn. O&K supplied all manner of railway equipment to the Army. Because of strained capacity at the Schlachtensee shops, work transferred in 1899 to a site in Nowawes, later Babelsberg, near Potsdam. Around 1908, O&K acquired the firm of Gerlach and König in Nordhausen, building petrol and diesel locomotives there under the trade mark "Montania".

Diversification

O&K expanded to build freight and passenger cars, and above all, excavators for construction.  The company also built other heavy equipment, including graders, dump trucks, forklift trucks, compressors, crawler loaders, wheeled loaders, road rollers, and truck cranes.

The company also began manufacturing escalators, transmissions, rapid-transit railway lines, buses, tractors, and cargo ships. Passenger liners, shipboard cranes, and shipbuilding enterprises rounded out the company's profile. Because of the company's thriving export business, a worldwide system of branch offices was created.

In the early years of the 20th century, O&K built bucket chain trenchers, at first from wood, and—after 1904—completely from steel. These were propelled by steam or oil engines. O&K also made railway trenchers for work in heavy soils.

In the First World War, O&K built railway engines and cars of all sizes for the German government.  With the collapse of Imperial Germany in November 1918, the victorious Allies put further restrictions on German manufacturing and military capacity, seizing all army Feldbahn engines as per the terms of the Versailles Treaty that ended the First World War. The treaty also removed access to export markets; at the end of 1925, work stopped for three months as a result of the lost business. By 1935, business had recovered and the company produced 5,299 locomotives. After the war, O&K's American subsidiary, the Orenstein-Arthur Koppel Company, was seized by the Alien Property Custodian and sold at an auction where only United States citizens were allowed to place bids.

Besides the Feldbahn contracts, the company produced Series 50 steam locomotives and standard gauge vehicles in the 1930s. The company produced diesel locomotives, and Series 44 and Series 50 steam engines, for  the national railway company, Deutsche Reichsbahn-Gesellschaft.

In 1922, they manufactured their first continuous-track steam shovel. In 1926, diesel engines replaced steam engines; the company converted earlier steam units to diesel power as the need arose.  O&K merged with a kerosene-engine builder, selling the engines under the O&K banner.

Nazi era and the Second World War

At the Spandau factory, O&K built cable-operated excavators and bucket-wheel excavators for use in the lignite coal mines of eastern Germany. Under the Aryanisation scheme of Adolf Hitler's Nazi Germany, the Orenstein family's shares in the company were forcibly sold in 1935; Orenstein and Koppel was placed under trust administration, and the Babelsberger works were taken over and renamed in 1941. O&K existed in name only, but more commonly used the abbreviation MBA (Maschienenbau und Bahnbedarf AG).

After heavy bomb attacks on Berlin caused a fire in the company's plant-administration buildings, factory production minister Albert Speer redistributed work and factories around the country to lessen the risk from a single attack. For the remainder of World War II, no more locomotives were built in Berlin. Four hundred and twenty-one locomotives already under construction were shifted to Prague to protect the existing factories.  During the war, O&K provided 400 Class 52 locomotives.

East Germany
After the end of the war, the locomotive plant in Nordhausen went idle.  Under the German Democratic Republic, O&K changed its name to the VEB Company, and resumed heavy mechanical manufacturing at Nordhausen, producing cable-operated excavator shovels, among other things.

By 1946, the Babelsberg factory resumed production of locomotive boilers, and one year later the plant delivered its first postwar locomotive.

The German Democratic Republic nationalised the railroads and rolling stock manufacturers.  The O&K plants in Babelsberg were renamed the LOWA Lokomotiv Plant Karl Marx (LKM). The LKM became the sole manufacturer of diesel locomotives for the GDR, such as the large DRG V180. In the late 1950s, the plant developed steam and diesel engines for the Deutsche Reichsbahn narrow-gauge railways, building approximately 4,160 engines.

Construction of steam locomotives ended in 1969, leaving diesel-hydraulic locomotives as the company's priority.  The company's last diesel locomotive was the DB Class V 60D, manufactured until 1976.
Over the course of 30 years as LKM, the company produced approximately 7,760 locomotives; about a third of that number were manufactured for export.

By 1964, the company had expanded into air-conditioning and refrigeration technology.

West Germany
In West Germany, the enterprise resumed operation after World War II in 1949, under the name Orenstein & Koppel AG, with headquarters in Berlin. In 1950, it incorporated under that name after merging with the Lübecker Crane Company.  After the construction of the Berlin Wall in 1961, the head office moved to Dortmund.

By the mid-1970s, the enterprise had grown steadily. In 1972, O&K had five working plants: West Berlin, Dortmund, Hagen, Hattingen/Ruhr, and Lübeck; it maintained a central spare-parts service in Bochum. That year, the company had 8,530 employees. The company had 24 business and sales offices in West Germany, and agencies on all five populated continents.

The West German company emphasised the manufacture of railroad cars and construction equipment, particularly excavators. In 1961, O&K manufactured Europe's first series of fully hydraulic excavators. They manufactured over 55,000 hydraulic excavators; more than 700 of those were rated at over 100 tons' service weight.

The company also diversified into escalator manufacturing.

Decline
After 1964, the railway-manufacturing unit was separated from the other production units.

The railway business was transferred to Bombardier, which continues to manufacture rolling stock in Berlin.  The Babelsberg site became an industrial park.

The escalator-manufacturing division was sold to the company's majority shareholder at the time, Friedrich Krupp AG Hoesch-Krupp, in 1996.

The construction-equipment business was sold to New Holland Construction, at the time part of the Fiat Group, in 1999.

Steam locomotives

Tender locomotives with two coupled axles (Type 0-4-0) 

Based on O&K's experience, they have created a number of type 0-4-0 standard designs, which have proven to be particularly suitable for many companies. Locomotives of these standard designs were always under construction, and locomotives of the most common strengths were always in stock, so that they could be dispatched immediately on request. Two-axle locomotives were mainly used by construction companies and industrial establishments; accordingly, special emphasis was placed on simple and practical construction. In particular, the locomotives were characterised by high tractive power, while the smaller types were generally based on a lower speed in favour of tractive power.

The standard-gauge locomotives in this category were particularly suitable for shunting and for operating purposes on branch lines.

For light railways, especially for narrow-gauge railways, with steep gradients, tight curves and generally a light superstructure and substructure, locomotives with only two axles did often not meet the requirements in terms of tractive force and caused wear of the track and the wheel tyres due to their wheel load. Therefore, larger locomotives with more axles were available, as shown below.

Tender locomotives with three coupled axles (Type 0-6-0) 

As with the two-axle coupled locomotives, the full weight of the machines with three coupled axles was used as adhesion weight. However, since the wheel pressure was distributed over six wheels instead of four, locomotives of this category could run on much lighter rails than two-axle locomotives with the same weight and therefore the same tractive force. This type of locomotive could therefore be used wherever the existing track required the most powerful locomotive possible without exceeding the permissible wheel pressure, or where the superstructure was to be constructed relatively lightly. Particularly on longer lines, the latter was considered for the sake of substantial savings. However, the track curves must be larger when using this locomotive than with the four-wheelers.

Locomotives with two coupled axles and one svivelling axle (Types 2-4-0 or 0-4-2) 

If the locomotive had to travel through small curves with a light superstructure, it was advisable to purchase a locomotive with two axles and a svivelling axle. This type was especially suitable for longer distances because, it allowed a light superstructure and was also able, to carry larger supplies than 0-4-0 locomotives with the same wheel pressure. The design also had the advantage that the centre of gravity could be set lower than on other types. This, together with the large wheelbase, gave the machines a particularly smooth ride. It could also run at a relatively higher speed, so that, according to the above, it was mainly suitable for small railways and feeder lines. Depending on the particular conditions, O&K installed the svivelling axle at the rear or at the front, but always in such a way that the greatest possible adhesive weight was maintained. Since the full weight of this type of machine could never be used as the adhesive weight, this construction was less suitable for carrying large loads. For such cases OK recommended the use of multi-axle coupled locomotives of the Gölsdorf type or, if small curves were available, to the locomotives of the Mallet or Klien-Lindner type, as shown below.

Coupled compound locomotives (Type 0-4-4-0, Mallet design) 

In many cases, where 0-4-0 or 0-6-0 steam locomotives were no longer sufficient, O&K built 0-4-4-0 or 0-6-6-0 compound locomotives, Mallet design, which supplemented the more conventional looking 0-4-2  locomotives (in Germany categorized as 2×2/2 and 2x3/3 double compound locomotives in comparison to the more conventional looking 2/3 locomotives). Apart from the possibility of being used on light superstructures and small curves, the locomotive had the advantage of great tractive power due to the composite arrangement of the cylinders, as the full weight was used as adhesion weight. The design was such that the boiler, driver's cab and storage boxes were connected to the rear frame, which carried the high-pressure cylinders, while the front frame, on which the low-pressure cylinders were located, was connected to the rear frame by two vertical hinges. The boiler with the water boxes rested on a slide track of the front frame, so that the latter could move freely under the boiler. The steam passed from the regulator in fixed pipes to the high-pressure cylinders and, after expansion in these, through an absolutely steam-tight, flexible, well-insulated pipe to the low-pressure cylinders. The exhaust steam entered the exhauster through a vertical movable pipe. A special valve made it possible to feed boiler steam directly to the low-pressure cylinders, so that all four cylinders came into operation immediately when the locomotive was started-up.

Locomotives with coupled hollow axles with radial and lateral movement (Klien-Lindner design) 

For railways with steep gradients and relatively light track construction, locomotives with two or three coupled axles often did not meet the requirements of increased traffic. Due to the high costs involved, the existing tracks could often not converted, and heavier locomotives with a larger number of axles were used. Where small curvatures precluded the use of long, fixed wheelbases, locomotives with steerable bogies or, for the sake of simplicity, locomotives with curvilinear coupled axles were often used. The acquisition of such locomotives was also be advisable for such new designs where the track systems and bridges were easier and cheaper to build. Since 1901, locomotives with coupled hollow axles have been built in particular according to the Klien-Lindner design, which has proved extremely successful in operation. The advantages of this design were:

 Large tractive force at a given permissible wheel pressure
 Large wheelbase with the best curve mobility and equal spring loading on both sides of each end axle and thus safe running of the locomotive
 Shock-free running into curves, as well as safe return to the centre position when running on straight track
 Equally good running when driving forwards and backwards
 Low wear of the rails and wheel tyres

The arrangement and mode of operation was as follows: The laterally and radially movable coupled axle was installed as the end axle, and in the case of eight- or ten-wheelers, these steering axles arranged at both ends ensured that the locomotive could enter the curves without difficulty. All axles were coupled in the usual way by fixed rods and mounted in axle bushes "bb" outside the wheels, following the spring play. The axle bushes sit in a continuous, fixed frame on which the steam cylinders are arranged in the usual way. The steering axle consists of a core axle "a" fixed in "bb" and driven in the usual way, and a hollow axle "c" which is firmly connected to the wheels and can be moved laterally and radially and which encloses the core axle, which is provided with a ball attachment in the middle, by means of a two-part ball cup "d".

The load on the axle was distributed by the ball pivot of the core axle "a" as it were by a transverse balancer on both wheels of the axle and thus equal wheel pressures and safety against derailment are obtained. The hollow axle is driven by a driving pin "f" pressed into the ball pivot of the core axle with sliding pieces at both ends, which have the necessary lateral play in the housing of the hollow axle for the deflection of the axle. In order to return the hollow axle to its central position after deflection, either return springs are arranged in the central housing, or, as can be seen in the following illustration, counter-guides "g" are arranged which, by means of brackets, enclose the hollow axles in the auxiliary bearing positions "ee" and effect unconstrained, shock-free adjustment of the hollow axle, since both end axles must execute their radial or lateral movement simultaneously. In order to counteract the unsteady running of the steering axles on the track and any lurching of the locomotive, these locomotives are fitted with an adjustable safety device which holds the drawbar frames in the central position on the track by means of spring tension; no pressure is exerted against the bearing points with this resetting device. These axles do not require any maintenance except for periodic lubrication. The periodic lubrication mentioned is only necessary at intervals of 1 to 2 months and is carried out after loosening the two lubricating screws "s" located on the centre of the axle by introducing grease or viscous oil into the sliding boxes of the driving pin. Only during a general inspection of the locomotives is it necessary to also inspect the hollow axles to make sure that the internal parts are in good condition.

O&K have used the Klien-Lindner axles for the Royal Prussian State Railways and many other railway in large numbers. The administration of the military railway has also introduced 0-8-0 locomotives with steerable coupled axles in place of the 0-6-0 field railway locomotives previously built.

Locomotives with laterally movable coupled axles (Gölsdorf design) 

Locomotives of the Gölsdorf design were only suitable for lines, on which there were relatively few and large curvatures. In this case it was sufficient to shift one or more coupling axles sideways in such a way that the movable axles were not guided in their axle bearings but by their own flanges. The bearings of the coupling rods have the same lateral play on their journals as the axles in the axle bearings. This type of construction has proven itself well on eight- and multi-wheel locomotives, but it was not suitable for very small curvatures. In terms of performance and even load distribution, etc., it was equivalent to the more common Klien-Lindner locomotives. They were used for main, branch and small railways.

Two of the five axles of a ten-wheel locomotive could move sideways relative to the frame because their axle boxes fixed them rigidly to the frame. The other axles, however, were fitted into their bearings and attached to their drives in such a way that they can be moved sideways during curve running, depending on the sideways forces acting on them. In addition the connecting and coupling rods, through which linear forces from the steam pistons were translated into the rotation of the wheels via the crank pins, also had to be able to move sideways.

Tramway locomotives (Type 0-4-0)

O&K built tramway locomotives, which were used for operation on tramways serving public traffic, either with a driver's cab at the front and rear or with only one driver's cab in the middle of the locomotive; furthermore with a power unit cover in two different designs. Whereas one version only served to conceal the engine from road traffic, the other version served to protect the engine parts against dust. The desired type of covering is to be specified. The weight of this locomotive was relatively high and therefore it could develop a great performance immediately when starting up, even on short gradients.

The fairing of all moving parts was intended to protect other road users such as pedestrians from serious injuries in case of accidents. It also prevented horses from shying and protected the transmission from dirt and dust on the unpaved roads that were common at the time. Often there was no stoker on tram locomotives, which meant they were operated by the driver in one-man operation. The short axle stands also ensured that narrow curves could be negotiated in city centres. Often, standing boilers were used for reasons of space.

Mining and tunnel locomotives 

For operation in tunnels or mine, O&K built locomotives in compliance with specific profiles. In the case of steam locomotives, it was possible to run them at high speed by fitting suitable devices and using particularly large boilers that could store a larger quantity of steam before passing through the tunnel. For use during tunnel construction or in underground mines, steam locomotives with oil firing equipment were particularly suitable, whereby smoke development and spark emission did not take place. The handling of these locomotives did not differ in any other respect from that of an ordinary locomotive. Furthermore, fireless locomotives were also very suitable for operation in tunnels and mines, as they completely avoid the nuisance of smoke, gases and sparks. Compressed air locomotives, which, however, required a special stationary system to generate the compressed air were also made and sold in smaller numbers.

Fireless locomotives 

Fireless locomotives were particularly suitable for use inside factories, yards etc., where it was essential to secure absolute freedom from any risk of fire. They were largely used for shunting purposes for paper mills, oil mills, wool mills, timber yards, gunpowder factories and similar works. These locomotives were constructed without fire boxes, the necessary steam being taken from a stationary boiler. The locomotive is able to work for several hours with one filling and can be operated with minimum expense as the driver needed less skills than that of a conventional steam engine.

Rack locomotives 

O&K delivered several types of cogwheel locomotives for mixed railways, on which ordinary operation alternated with cogwheel operation. Mixed railways were used in changing terrains with only single steep gradient, which could not be negotiated by ordinary adhesion locomotives. Accordingly, only these steep gradients were equipped with toothed bars. The mode of operation was as follows: The two steam cylinders outside the frame drove the driving gearwheel for the rack by means of a double gearing with the appropriate transmission. This driving gear wheel sat on a special axle fixed in the frame and was connected to the friction axles by coupling rods, so that the gear wheel axle and friction axles were driven simultaneously. The locomotives could therefore run on normal rail tracks as well as on toothed tracks. On the toothed track, the driving gear and the friction wheels worked together. The effect of the latter was also utilised on the toothed track and the load on the rack was relieved accordingly. The locomotives worked either on a on a simple flat steel rack or on Riggenbach ladder rack. A cumulative number of only 6 to 9 rack steam locomotives were made by O&K in total.

Locomotives with a separate tender 

Locomotives with a separate tender did not carry all their fuel and water on board the locomotive and were thus particularly useful for travelling long distances without being refuelled. The locomotives were equipped to be either heated by coal, wood or oil, because a larger heating and grate area were required. The main types had from four to twelve wheels for the locomotive and four, six or eight wheels on the tender.

The water tanks were firmly fastened to the frame of the tender, while maintaining a low centre of gravity. The coupling between locomotive and tender was similar to that of the waggons, to ensure that the locomotive could be driven without the tender for shunting or on short distances. The tender was easily accessible from the engineer's cab. If the locomotive was heated by wood, the tender had a special fence to increase the volume of its load.

Coupled compound locomotives (Type 0-6-6-0, Kitson-Meyer design) 

After Orenstein & Koppel (O&K) had delivered the prototype of a Kitson-Meyer locomotive for the 600 mm gauge to the Chilean military railway in 1927, an order for three locomotives followed in 1937. In 1939, the locomotives with the factory numbers 13306 to 13308 were completed. The locomotives had riveted bridge and bogie frames. The boiler, cab, reservoir and ash box were also riveted. The engines located at the two bogie ends worked on the centre axle set. This wheelset could also be sanded. The control system was of the Heusinger type. While the prototype had a Westinghouse brake, the production locomotives had a Knorr brake. The air pump was attached to the rear water tank, while the main air tank was above it on the water tank. The locomotive had electrically operated headlights.

Due to the beginning of the Second World War, the vehicles could not been delivered to Chile. They were then tested by O&K on the Rehagen-Klausdorf army training area and probably also on lines of the Mecklenburg-Pomeranian narrow-gauge railway. In 1944, the Deutsche Reichsbahn acquired the locomotives to use them on lines in occupied Poland. Therefore, in the second half of the same year, they were handed over to Gedob Direktion Krakow, where they were stationed at BW Jedrzejow.

List of Orenstein & Koppel narrow-gauge steam locomotives
The factory produced 14,387 steam locomotives from 1899 to 1945 at its Berlin site (Drewitz, Nowawes, Babelsberg) with the works number range from 337 to 12965.

{| class="wikitable sortable"
|-
! Works No !! Year !! Photo !! Wheel arrangement !! Gauge !! Power !! Use
|-
| 366 || 1899 ||  || 0-4-0 ||  || 20 hp || Delivered via the O&K sales office in Budapest to Earl Károly Imre in Nagymágócs near Oroszhaza. 1941 used at the fortifications in Szolyva and in 1945 returned to Mattersburg in Austria. Now being operated in Feld- und Industriebahnmuseum Freiland, Austria.
|-
| 367 || 1899 ||  || 0-4-0 ||  || || Delivered via the Swedish general agent Carl Ström to the Hamra–Tumba Järnvägen of Gustaf de Laval on Gotland in Sweden. From 1916 owned by the construction company Byggnads AB, who sold it to the city of Stockholm in 1917 for work on Hammarbyleden.
|-
| 418 || 1899 ||  || 0-6-0 ||  ||  || Bröl Valley Railway, BTE 14–17
|-
| 531 || 1900 ||  || 0-4-2||  || 60 hp || Initially at sugar mill Nakel (Cukrownia Nakło), now Narrow Gauge Railway Museum in Wenecja, Poland
|-
| 576-578 || ||  || 0-4-4-0Mallet  ||  || 120 hp || Kalan 
|-
| 591 || 1900 ||  || ||  || 80 hp || Kirchlengern–Hille railway (Wallückebahn) in Germany 
|-
| 596 || 1900 ||  || Initially 0-4-0, later 0-6-0 ||  || 125 hp || Soest No 9 of the Ruhr-Lippe-Eisenbahngesellschaft in Germany

|-
| 614 || 1900 ||  || 0-4-0 ||  || 30 hp || Initially Pakis Baru 1, now Statfold Barn Railway
|-
| 617 ||  ||  || 0-6-2 ||  || 100 hp || Two-cylinder locomotive with three coupled axles and one radial axle. Steam bell, outer frame, upper water tanks. Delivered to the Rosenberger Kreisbahn
|-
| 683 || 1900 ||  || 0-4-0 || 508 mm (1 ft 8 in) || 10 hp || Dinty, Cosmopolitan Proprietary Mine, Kookynie, Western Australia
|-
|  || ca 1900 ||   || 0-4-0 ||  ||  || Moira Coal Mine, Collie, Western Australia
|-
|  || ca 1900 ||   || 0-4-0 ||  ||  || Sugar cane plantation of the  Nederlandsch-Indische Spoorwegen
|-
| || ca 1900 ||  || || || || Douglas, Port Douglas Tramway from Mossman to Port Douglas in Queensland, Australia
|-
| 687 || 1901 ||  || 0-4-0 ||  || 20 hp || Ceper 2, PG Gondang Baru, Klaten, Indonesia
|-
| 718 || 1901 ||  || 0-4-0 ||  || 30 hp || Magnet № 2, Magnet Silver Mining Co, Tasmania, now Wee Georgie Wood Railway
|-
| 719 || 1901 ||  || 0-4-0 ||  || 30 hp || Ordered by North Mount Farrell Mining in Tasmania but not operated there, later Cairns Town Council, Edge Hill Tramway, Queensland
|-
| 723 || 1900 ||  || 0-4-0 ||  || 30 hp || Kearsney–Stanger Light Railway in the Colony of Natal (now KwaZulu-Natal in South Africa)
|-
| 724 || 1900 ||  || 0-6-0 ||  || 50 hp || Kearsney–Stanger Light Railway in the Colony of Natal (now KwaZulu-Natal in South Africa
|-
| 725 ||  ||  || 4-2-0||  || 40 hp || Monte Alegre for the Usina Monte Alegre sugar mill in Piracicaba in São Paulo Brazil
|-
| 731 || 1902 ||  || 0-4-2||  || 40 hp || East Murchison United Ltd, Lawlers, Western Australia
|-
| 772 || 1901 ||  || 0-4-2 ||  || 60 hp || Jatiroto J70, Jatiroto, PG Jatiroto, Indonesia
|-
| 773 || 1901 ||  || 0-4-2 ||  || 60 hp || Ngadirejo 71, PG Ngadirejo, Kediri, Indonesia
|-
| 777 || 1901 ||  || 0-4-2 ||  || 60 hp ||  Pajarakan 2 Kelut, PG Pajarakan, Probolinggo,  Indonesia
|-
|  || ca 1901 ||  || 0-4-2 ||  || 60 hp ||  Tender locomotive with open cab, traction pump, suspension, hand bell, melting plug. Built according to Dutch-Indian regulations. Delivered to India.
|-
| 810 || ||  || 0-4-0 || || || The so-called Stink Express disposed waste and sewage sludge in Jodhpur, Rajasthan, India
|-
| 819 || 1901 ||  || 0-4-0 ||  825 mm (2 ft  in) || 20 hp || Burdekin, James Boyd, firewood supplier, Charters Towers, Queensland, Australia
|-
| 851 || 1902 ||  || 0-4-0 ||  || 30 hp || Initially P. Dinndorf, Strasbourg, now agricultural museum in Eschach-Seifertshofen, Germany 
|-
| 882 || Delivered 1901 ||  || 0-4-4-0 Mallet ||  || || Magnet Tramway No. 2, Tasmania. Supplied by Central Mining & Tramway Appliances Proprietary Ltd 1901.
|-
| 893 || 1901 ||  || 0-4-2||  || 60 hp || Merican 4, PG Merican, Kediri, Indonesia
|-
| 894 || 1901 ||  || 0-4-2||  || 60 hp || Merican 6, PG Merican, Kediri, Indonesia
|-
| 898 || 1901 ||  || 0-4-2 ||  || 60 hp || Rejosari 1 PG Rejosari, Madiun, Indonesia
|-
| 930 || 1902 ||  || 0-4-4-0 Mallet  ||  || 80 hp || No 5 Hamra, Östra Södermanlands Järnväg, Sweden
|-
|  || ca 1902 ||  || 0-4-4-0 Mallet ||  ||  || Toul № 1, Public works company Estrade-Taher, France
|-
| || ca 1902 ||  || 0-4-0 ||  || 125 hp || Two-cylinder compound locomotive with two coupled axles. Supplied to the Ruhr-Lippe-Kleinbahnen. Steam bell, vacuum brake (König system), central lubrication device
|-
| || ca 1902 ||  || 0-4-0 || || ||
|-
| || ca 1902–1912 ||  || 0-4-4-0 Mallet ||  || || Sigi railway, Tanzania
|- 
| 1001 || 1905 ||  || 0-6-0 || || 107 hp|| Asturias, № 6, narrow gauge railway Valdepeñas–Puertollano (El trenillo de La Calzá), Spain
|-
| 1089 || ||  || 0-4-4-0 Mallet ||  ||  || Lenz Type ii, built by Orenstein & Koppel, No 11–16
|-
| 1162 || 1903 ||  || 0-4-0 ||  || 80 hp || Initially Jacob & Bartisch construction company, Leipzig, later lignite mine Concordia, Nachterstedt, from 1930 lignite mine Gewerkschaft Humboldt, Thüste-Wallensen 8, since 1966 exhibited at the playground Seelze-Letter, since 1994 Emmerthal-Lüntorf, since 1996 narrow gauge museum Rittersgrün, Saxony, Germany
|-
| 1167 || 1903 ||  || Bn2t ||  || 50 hp || Turba 3, Minas de Utrillas, Spain, since 1983 at the heritage railway Paderborn, since 1985 Guldental 1, Heddesheimer Feldbahn H&G Faust
|-
| 1339 || 1904 ||  || 0-4-0 ||  || 10 hp || Initially Rigeo–Eretria railway, now railway museum Athens
|-
| 1358 || ca 1912 ||  || 0-4-4-0 Mallet ||  || || Mallet locomotive with outher cylinders for the Bromberger Kreisbahnen ("von Eisenhardt")
|-
| 1411 || 1904 ||  || 0-4-0 || 560 mm (22 Zoll) || 20 hp || Northern Colliery Company, Waro Limestone Scenic Reserve, New Zealand. Sold on to New Zealand Cement Co. on Limestone Island in the 1910s and from there to Wilson's Portland Cement Co. in Portland in 1918, where it was operated as Bertha. It later went to the Museum of Transport and Technology in Auckland, where it is still preserved as a museum.
|-
| 1450 || 1905 ||  || 0-4-4-0 ||  || 120 hp || Atlamaxac, built for Mr. Sebastian de Mier's ranch in Atlamaxac, Puebla, Mexico.
|-
|-
| 1459 || 1905 ||  || 0-4-0 ||  || ||Domburg of the Utrecht builder J. van Noordenne, who sold it in 1908 to the builder Arntz in Millingen. Unusual track gauge of  instead of 900 mm.
|-
| 1473 || 1905 ||  || 0-4-4-0 Mallet ||  || 60 hp || Initially sugar mill Pakis Baru, now Statfold Barn Railway
|-
| 1480 || ||  || 0-4-0 || || 20 hp || Sydney (Alte Normalien, old standard) was used by Orson Wright & Co between 1907 and 1911 in the construction of the Ambergate Reservoir. The locomotive passed to H. Arnold & Son on 10 May 1912.
|-
| 1498 || 1904 ||  || 0-6-0 ||  || 50 hp || Rajahgopal, Cochin State Forest Tramway
|-
| || ca 1903–1905 ||  || 0-4-4-0 Mallet ||  || || Magnet Tramway No. 3, Tasmania. Supplied by Central Mining & Tramway Appliances Proprietary Ltd between 1903 and 1905. Front (low pressure) cylinders 12 inches × 12 inches; rear (high pressure) cylinders 8 inches × 12 inches; wheel diameter 2 feet 1 inch; rigid wheelbase 4 feet 3 inches; total wheelbase 10 feet; boiler pressure 170 lb per square inch; weight in service 18 tons.
|-
| 1567 || 1905 ||  || 2-4-0 ||  (Swedish 3 ft gauge)  ||  || Borgholm, initially Borgholm-Böda Järnväg (BBJ) No 1., later Ölands Järnvägar Nr. 7
|-
| 1568 || 1905 ||  || 2-4-0 ||  (Swedish 3 ft gauge) ||  || Initially Borgholm-Böda Järnväg (BBJ) No 2., later Ölands Järnvägar No 8
|-
| 1602 || 1905 ||  || 0-4-0 || || || Grytgöl, № 4, Ljusfallshammar, Sweden
|-
| 1611 || 1906 ||  || 0-4-0 ||  (Swedish 3 ft gauge)  ||  || Göta sulfitfabrik (Västergötland)
|-
| 1627 || 1905 ||  || 0-4-0 ||  || 40 hp || Bertha, № 12, Chemin de fer des Chanteraines
|-
| 1694 || 1920 ||  || 0-4-0 ||  || || Gas Light and Coke Co (G. L. C. C.), Kensal Green
|-
| 1696 || 1906 ||  || 0-4-0 ||  || 20 hp || Forest railway locomotive on the grass verge of Avenida Mitre between Avenida López Torres and Calle 25 de Mayo in Posadas, Argentina. The cow-catcher is probably based on the imagination of the erectors. The driver's cab also seems to be a simplified replica.
|-
| 1767 || 1905 ||  || ||  || || Matheran Hill Railway
|-
| 1775 || 1906 ||  || 4-2-0 ||  || 50 hp || No. 1 South-Western Railway Company, Knysna, South Africa
|-
| 1786 || 1905 ||  || 0-4-4-0 Mallet ||  || 80 hp || Pesantren 150,  PG Pesantren Baru, Kediri, Indonesia
|-
| 1878 || 1906 ||  || ||  || || Built for Caminho de Ferro Mossamedes, Angola
|-
| 1787 || 1905 ||  || 0-4-4-0 Mallet ||  || 80 hp || Pesantren 151,  PG Pesantren Baru, Kediri, Indonesia
|-
| 1847 || 1906 ||  || 4-4-0 ||   (Swedish 3 ft gauge) || || Der Kaiser, initially Borgholm–Böda Järnväg BBJ No 3, later Ölands Järnväg ÖJ No 9, since 1947 SJ w3p 3059, scrapped in 1953
|-
|1870–1875, 2069–2070, 2356–2361, 2731–2734, 3182–3184, 4198–4199 || 1906–1910 ||  || 0-8-01'Dnv2t (No. 1-6)1'Dn2t (others) ||  || || Lüderitz Bay Railway and South African Railways
|-
|2029 || 1906 ||  || 0-4-0T ||  || 20 hp || 
LVD1, Parada Sud Quarry near Pueblo Centenario. Hanko & Co, Argentinia, preserved by Círculo de Estudios Ferroviarios del Uruguay (CEFU) at the Railway Museum in Montevideo Central Station, Uruguay, ex Lucas José Obes
|-
| 2046 || 1906 ||  || 0-4-0 ||  || || Used by ASEA for the construction of the northern part of the  Lidingöbanan
|-
| 2053 || 1906 ||  || 0-4-0 ||  || 40 hp || Frankfurter Feldbahnmuseum No. 4
|-
| 2076 || 1906 ||  || 0-4-0 ||  || 40 hp ||  Used by ASEA for the construction of the Lidingöbanan
|-
| 2098 || 1906 ||  || 0-4-4-0 Mallet ||  || 30 hp || Wonolangan 7, PG Wonolangan, Probolinggo, Indonesia
|-
| 2220 ||  ||  || 0-4-2 ||  ||  || Khartum–Wadi Halfa railway
|-
| 2240 || 1907 ||  || 0-6-0 ||  || 100PS || No. 2 South-Western Railway Company, Knysna, South Africa
|-
| 2271 || 1907 ||  || 0-4-0 ||  || 30 hp || Initially Public Works Department of Victoria, land reclamation work at the Coode Canal, Port Melbourne, later Western Australian Public Works Department, Point Samson–Roebourne
|-
| 2303 || 1907 ||  || 0-4-0 ||  || 30 hp || Harvey, Western Australia (see also No 2271/1997)
|-
| 2342 || 1907 ||  || 0-6-0 ||  || 150 hp || 739 Matheran, Matheran Hill Railway, heute National Rail Museum of India, New Delhi.
|-
| 2343 || 1907 ||  || 0-6-0 ||   || 150 hp || 740 Matheran, Matheran Hill Railway, now Leighton Buzzard Light Railway
|-
| 2378 || 1907 ||  || 0-4-0 ||  || 30 hp || Utrillas, West Lancashire Light Railway
|-
| 2424 || 1907 || || 0-4-0 ||  || 20 hp || Similar to 2461/1907. Whim Creek Copper Mine near City of Karratha, Western Australia.
|-
| || 1907 || || 0-8-0 || || || Naters, Switzerland
|-
| 2413-2416 || ||  || 0-8-0 ||  ||  || Loetschberg №42, Switzerland
|-
| 2448 || 1908 ||  || 0-4-0 || || || Delivered to Lötschbergbahn as a construction locomotive, later probably Simplon No. 4, used at Brig during the construction of the Simplon Tunnel
|-
| 2475 || 1907 ||  || 0-4-0 ||  || || Fia, № 1, Aspa Bruk (Ägare Munksjö AB), Sweden
|-
| 2525 || ||  || 0-4-0 ||  (Swedish 3 ft gauge) || || Skånska Järnvägar
|-
| 2604 || 1907 ||  || 0-6-0 ||  || 150 hp || Cochin State Forest Tramway
|-
| 2609 || 1907 ||  || 0-4-4-0 Mallet ||  || 110 hp || Orenstein & Koppel Ltd, London-Berlin, General-Agents, The ‚Central' Mining & Tramway Appliances Proprietary Ltd 40, Hunter Street, Sydney Magnet Tramway, now Bennett Brook Railway
|-
| 2641 || 1907 ||  || 0-4-0 ||  ||  || Union Bergb. Wien (1907–), Rheinregulierungsbahn Steffi (1937–), now Technisches Museum, TMW-Depot Marchegg
|-
| 2649 || 1908 ||  || 0-4-0 ||  || 40 hp || Tacot des Lacs
|-
|  || ca 1908  ||  || 0-4-0 ||  || || Taube (pigeon), the US army conficated the German locomotive in World War I near Cierges in France
|-
| 2677 || 1907||  || 0-8-0 ||  || 200 hp || Loetschberg N° 32, compressed air locomotive  
|-
| 2681 || 1907 ||  || 0-4-0 ||  || 20 hp || Bauru, São Paulo, Brazil
|-
| 2697 || 1908 ||  || ||  || || Moortje, Efteling Stoomtrein Maatschappij, near Kaatsheuvel between Waalwijk and Tilburg, Netherlands
|-
| 2728 || 1908 ||  || 0-4-4-0 Mallet ||  || 60 hp || Rejo Agung 23 PonenII, PG Rejo Agung, Madiun, Indonesia (siehe auch: Nr. 4494/1910)
|-
| 2748 || ||  || ||  ||  || Dunkley Brothers, North East Dundas Tramway
|-
| 2762 || 1907 ||  || 0-8-0 ||  || 35 hp || PG Tulungagung 1, Mojopanggung, Java, Indonesia
|-
| 2797 || 1908 || || 0-4-4-0Mallet ||  || 80 hp || Initially Compania Minera de Torreon, Mexico, later Cia. Minera de Penoles-Avalos, Mexico, since 1964 № 1, Cripple Creek and Victor Narrow Gauge Railroad, Colorado, USA
|-
| 2966 || 1908 ||  || 0-4-2 ||  || 40 hp || De Maas 4, PG De Maas, Besuki, Indonesia
|-
| 2967 || 1908 ||  || 0-4-2 ||  ||  || Lumajang, PG Jatiroto , Indonesia
|-
| 3009 || 1908 || || 0-6-0 ||  || 140 hpi || KKP No 1, Kleinbahn Klockow–Pasewalk, since 1950  DR 99 4612
|-
| 3010 || 1908 ||   || 0-6-0 ||  || 140 hpi || KKP No 2, Kleinbahn Klockow–Pasewalk, since 1950  DR 99 99 4613
|-
| 3019 ||  ||  || 0-4-2||  ||  || Initially Hollandse Anneming Maatschappij, later harbour locomotive of SA Railways in Paardeneiland, Cape Town
|-
| 3053 || 1908 ||  || 0-4-0 ||  || Dampf50 hp || Aquilla, initially Wuytack de Gand, Belgium, later S. A. de Beton Belges, then Rail Rebecq Rognon
|-
| 3127 ||  ||  || || ||  || Gerald & Lorna Dee Collection, Museums Victoria
|-
| 3136 || 1908 ||  || 0-4-0 ||  or  || 40 hp || Amberley Museum Railway
|-
| 3161-3163 || 1908 ||  || 0-4-0 ||  || 40 hp || Island of Angaur in German New Guinea, from 1918 Nanyo-Agency (南洋庁) in the Japanese South Seas Mandate. The following  gauge O&K locomotives were supplied to Deutsche Südseephosphat AG, Angaur: Nos 3161, 3162 & 3163 in 1908, No 4236 in 1910 and No 4783 in 1911.
|-
| 3174 || 1908 ||  || 0-6-0 ||  || || Ortal Group K6, Tramways du Lot-et-Garonne, Tonneins, France
|-
| 3216 || 1908 ||  || 0-4-0 || 900 mm || 90 hp || Unterengstringen ZH, gravel pit Kieswerk am Hardwald, Dietikon, Switzerland
|-
| 3377 || 1908 ||  || 0-8-0 ||  ||  ||  Glückauf, Trusebahn, later DR 994531
|-
| 1430 || 1908 ||  || 0-8-0 ||  || 200 hp || Kattowitz II. The Urskog–Hølandsbanen from Sørumsand to Skulerud in Norway ( gauge) got an offer for an O&K locomotive like the one, but never bought it.
|-
| 3310 || 1909 ||  || 0-6-0 ||  || 60 hp || German Annie, № 4, Proserpine Central Mill Co Ltd, Queensland, Australia
|-
| 3311 || 1909 ||  || C'1 n2t ||  || 120 hp || Kaiser, Gin Gin Central Mill Co Ltd, Wallaville, Queensland, Australia
|-
| 3317 || 1909 ||  || 0-4-2 ||  || 40 hp || Jatiroto 23J, Lumajang, PG Jatiroto, Indonesia 
|-
| 3324 || 1909 ||  || || || || Sugar mill Ketanen, Modjokerto, East Java, Dutch East Indies (now Indonesia)
|-
| 3325 || 1909 ||  || || || || Sugar mill Ketanen, Modjokerto,  East Java, Dutch East Indies (now Indonesia)
|-
| 3358 || 1909 ||  || 0-3-0 || Monorail locomotive (Ewing System)|| || Patiala State Monorail Tramways, now National Rail Museum of India, New Delhi. The locomotive's three wheels run with double wheel flanges on a steel rail laid along a road and transfer about 95% of the weight. A support wheel prevents the locomotive from tipping over.
|-
| 3362 || 1909 ||  || 0-4-0T || 900 mm or 891 mm || 140 hp || H. Weber, Unnam, construction of the Osterfeld-Hamm railway delivered to Datteln Skanska Cement AB Schweden, later Limhama, preserved as Cementa, N° 16 at Hesselby Jernvägar, Gotland, Sweden 
|-
| 3452 || 1910 ||  || 0-4-4-0 Mallet || || 80 hp || Compagnie de l'Union in Mazaugues, France
|-
| 3493 || 1909 ||  || 2-4-0 ||  || || The Borneo Co. Ltd. in Lampang in Siam
|-
| 3498 || 1909 ||  || 0-4-0 ||  || 20 hp || Anita № 6, Mines at Dícido, Mioño, Spain
|-
| 3509 || ||  || 0-6-0 || || || 
|-
| 3724 ||  ||  || 0-4-0 ||  ||  || Bei Drabo in Östergötland, Sweden
|-
| 3753 || 1909 ||  || 0-8-0 ||  || 60 hp || Pagottan 1, PG Pagottan, Madiun, Indonesia
|-
| 3771 || 1909 ||  || 0-6-0 ||  || 50 hp || Goodwood Tramway, Kalgoorlie and Boulder Firewood Co, Beria, Western Australia
|-
| 3789  || 1910 ||  || 0-8-0 ||  || 100 hp || Kanigoro Nr. 5, PG Kanigoro, Madiun, Indonesia
|-
| 3902 || 1909 ||  || 0-4-4-0Mallet ||  || 30 hp || Frankfurter Feldbahnmuseum No 13
|-
| 3904 ||  ||  || 2-4-0  || || || From Orenstein-Arthur Koppel Company, 30 Church St., New York via Schwab & Tillmann, agent for Cuba, San Ignacio 76, Habana to Central dos Amigos,

|-
| 3940 || 1910 ||  || 0-6-6-0 Mallet ||  || 500 hp || 55 t, NWE No 32 of three Nordhausen-Wernigeroder Eisenbahn-Gesellschaft
|-
| 3980 || 1910 ||  || 0-8-0 ||  || 80 hp || Initially Toth Mihaly, Budapest, later 764.211, then 6110 Rachita Museum Satului, Bukarest, since 2004 Măriuța, Mocăniță pe traseul CFF Vișeu, Romania
|-
| 3952 || 1910 ||  || 0-8-0 ||  || 100 hp || Purwodadi 8, PG Purwodadi, Ngawi, Indonesia
|-
| || ca 1910 ||  || || || || Theo, Sugar mill Tjoekir in Jombang, Indonesia
|-
| 3961 || 1910 ||  || 0-8-0 ||  || 50 hp || Goodwood Timber and Tramway Co Ltd, Port Albert, Victoria, Australia
|-
| 3999 || 1910 ||  || 0-6-0 ||  || || Ortal Group K4, Tramways du Lot-et-Garonne, Tonneins, France
|-
| 4011 || 1910 ||  || 0-6-0 ||  || 20 hp || Ferrocarril Austral Fueguino, El Tren del Fin del Mundo, now plinted at the jail of Ushuaia
|-
| 4017 || 1910 ||  || 0-4-0 || Initially , later  || 20 hp || FC Midland de Buenos Aires and Talleres Libertad, later Domingo Faustino Sarmiento Railway X-5, now Plaza Once, Buenos Aires, Argentina
|-
| 4028 || ||  || ||  || || Makatea, Tuamotu, French Polynesia
|-
| 4058 || 1910 ||  || 0-4-0 || || || Carnarvon Tramway, Western Australia
|-
| 4083 || 1910 ||  || 0-4-0 ||  || 40 hp || Münster
|-
| 4115 || 1910 ||  || 0-8-0T ||  || 40 hp || Lovcen, BAr/Virpazar, Montenegro, now on display at Podgorica station
|-
| 4134 || 1910 ||  || 0-4-0+t ||  || || Cornellá, No 14, Narrow gauge railway Palamós–Girona–Banyoles and later narrow gauge railway Valdepeñas–Puertollano 
|-
| 4135 || 1910 ||  || 0-4-0+t ||  || || Mercedes, No 15, Narrow gauge railway Palamós–Girona–Banyoles and later narrow gauge railway Valdepeñas–Puertollano
|-
| 4244 || 1910 ||  || 0-8-0 ||  || 60 hp || Pagottan 2, PG Pagottan, Madiun, Indonesia
|-
| 4264 || 1910 ||  || 0-8-0 ||  || 60 hp || Kanigoro 2, Madiun, Java, Indonesia
|-
| 4300 || 1910 ||  || 0-8-0 ||  || 60 hp || Olean 7, PG Olean, Situbondo, Indonesia
|-
| 4360 || 1910 ||  || 0-8-0 ||  || 60 hp || Olean 2, PG Olean, Situbondo, Indonesia
|-
| 4400 || 1910 ||  || 0-8-0 ||  || 60PS || Kebonagung 2, PG Kebonagung, Malang, Indonesia
|-
| 4445 || 1910 ||  || 0-8-0 ||  || 60 hp || Purwodadi 10, PG Purwodadi, Ngawi, Indonesia
|-
|  || 1910 ||  || 0-6-0 ||  || || Nr. 59. Initially Ferrocarriles del Estado and a construction company of Santiago del Estero, later Tranway Rural Reconquista
|-
| || 1910 ||  || 0-4-0 || || 40 hp || Initially Isnardi Alves & Cia, since 1913 Cia. Matte Laranjeira at Estrada de Ferro Guairá a Porto Mendes, since 1944 N° 4 of Serviço de Navegação da Bacia do Prata (SNBP), operational until 1959 or 1916, now exhibited at Guaíra, Paraná, Brazil 
|-
| 4614-4621 || 1911 ||  || 1'Dn2 ||  || || Lüderitz Bay Railway and South African Railways
|-
| 4623 || 1911 ||  || 0-6-0 || Initially , later  || 60 hp || First locomotive of the FCCSA, preserved at Estación Wánchaq, Cuzco, Peru
|-
| 4631 || 1911 ||  || Bn2t ||  ||  || Grafton Copper Mining Co in Cangai near Grafton in New South Wales, Australia
|-
| 4359 || 1910 ||  || 0-8-0 ||  || 60 hp || Purwodadi 16, PG Purwodadi, Ngawi, Indonesia
|-
| 4494 || 1910 || || 0-4-4-0 Mallet ||  || 60 hp ||  Rejoagung № 23 PonenII (see also No 2728/1908)
|-
| 4676 || 1911 ||  || 0-4-0 ||  || 30 hp || Mizuma Town, Kurume, Fukuoka, Japan
|-
| 4698-4700 || 1911 ||  || || || || Japan
|-
| 4720 || 1911 ||  || 0-4-0 ||  || 30 hp || Initially Usines Carrières de Vaujours et Livry-Gargan, later Roche-sur-Foron, Haute Savoie, now Stefanie, Chemin de fer touristique d'Abreschviller
|-
| 4819 || || || || || || Delivered to Francisco Brunet Manati. The lettering "Orenstein & Arthur Koppel, Comp. Berlin-Nueva York, Agentes Generales para la usla de Puerto-Rico, Koerber & Co, San Juan" is unusual. O&K delivered only 19 locomotives to Puerto Rico, and the name Koerber does not appear in the delivery lists. Orenstein & Koppel - Arthur Koppel was otherwise used.

|-
| 4863 || 1911 ||  || 0-8-0 ||  || 60 hp || Gempolkerep 15, Mojokerto, Indonesia
|-
| 4868 || 1911 ||  || 0-8-0 ||  || 60 hp || Asembagus 16 Slamet, Asembagus, Situbondo, Indonesia
|-
| 4870 || 1911 ||  || 0-8-0 ||  || 60 hp || Wringinanom 6, PG Wringinanom, Situbondo, Indonesia
|-
| 4880 || 1911 ||  || 0-8-0 ||  || || South-Western Railway Company, Knysna, South Africa
|-
| 4930 || 1911 ||  || 0-4-0 ||  || 30 hp  || Initially Wegerif, Amsterdam, later brick works Ijsseloord, Arnhem, Netherlands, since 1968 Aagje, Efteling Stoomtrein Maatschappij, near Kaatsheuvel between Waalwijk and Tilburg, Netherlands
|-
| 4990 || 1911 ||  || 0-8-0 ||  || 60 hp || Wonolangan 2, PG Wonolangan, Probolinggo, Indonesia
|-
| 4991 || 1911 ||  || 0-4-4-0 Mallet ||  || 80 hp || Asembagus 8,  Asembagus, Situbondo, Indonesia
|-
| 5020 || 1911 ||  || 0-8-0 ||  ||  || Tx2-355, Narrow Gauge Railway Museum in Wenecja, Poland, now Plac Strzelecki, Wroclaw 
 |-
| 5081 || 1911 ||   || 0-6-2 || 508 mm (1 ft 8 in) || 50 hp || The Sons of Gwalia Ltd, Leonora, Western Australia, Koppel 
|-
| 5102 || 1912 ||  || 0-4-0 ||  || 140 hp || Poldark Mine bei Wendron, Cornwall
|-
| 5152 || 1911 ||  || 0-8-0 ||  || 80 hp || Kanigoro 4, PG Kanigoro, Madiun, Indonesia
|-
| 5179 || 1912 ||  || 0-4-0 ||  || 50 hp || Katharina, Moor- und Fehnmuseum Elisabethfehn in Barßel, Germany
|-
|  || ca 1912 ||  || 0-4-0 ||  || 50 hp ||
|-
| 5199 || 1911 ||  || 0-8-0 ||  || 60 hp || Rendeng 02, PG Rendeng, Kudus, Indonesia
|-
| 5217 || 1912 ||  || 0-8-0 ||  || 60 hp || Gempolkerep 14, Mojokerto, Indonesia
|-
| 5297 || 1912 ||  || 0-4-0 ||  || 40 hp || Miyazaki Kotsu Railway SL No 1 (1913–1962), now JR Lyushu Nichinan Line
|-
| 5301–5305 || 1912 || || || || 20 hp || Delivered to Argentina. The main dimensions changed in 1912 from 145 mm × 260 mm cylinders and 900 mm axle distance (Alte Normalien, old standard) to 150 mm × 275 mm cylinders and 1200 mm axle distance (Neue Normalien, new standard)
|-
| 5335 || 1912 ||  || C n2 ||  || 80 hp || Sri Maharacha Timber Company SRJ, Si Racha, SRJ 6, now Surasak Montri Public Park, Si Racha Thailand
|-
| 5438 || 1912 ||  || 0-8-0 ||  || 60 hp || Merapi 15, Asembagus, Situbondo, Indonesia
|-
| 5440 || 1912 ||  || 0-4-0 ||  || 60 hp || Olean 4, PG Olean, Situbondo, Indonesia
|-
| 5658 || 1912 ||  || 0-4-0 ||  || || Stockholms Elektricitetsverk, Untraverket 1, 1916 decommissioned, since 1917 Vattenfall CF 10, decommissioned 1952.
|-
| 5662 || 1912 ||  || 0-4-0 ||  || 50 hp || Initially Argentina, now Apedale Valley Light Railway. After leaving Statfold Barn Railway for a private site in Whaley Bridge in 2013, it came to Apedale in May 2022 after a full restoration to steam. The original livery from Argentina has been retained by the owners, and it is paired with a tender from its time in Argentina. It will be based at Apedale for the foreseeable future and will operate occasionally on passenger trains throughout the year.
|-
| 5668 || 1913 ||  || 0-4-0 ||  or  || 30 hp || Initially Penrhyn Quarry Railway. 1963 sold to Bressingham Steam and Gardens'''. Since 1995 at Bredgar and Wormshill Light Railway.
|-
| 5672 || 1912 ||  || 0-6-0 ||  || || Petter, No 1, Lindfors-Bosjöns JärnvägLars-Gunnar Nyqvist: (LBB) Lindfors-Bosjöns Järnväg.
|-
| 5745 || 1912 ||  || 0-4-0 ||  || 20 hp || Initially Ferrocarriles en el cono sur FCS (Argentina), now Chapel Hydraulique GmbH, Kimmerle-Ring, Günzburg, Germany
|-
| 5754 || 1913 ||  || 2-6-0 ||  || 200 hp || E 94, Vale de Vouga, Comboios de Portugal, Portugal
|-
|-
| 5756 || 1913 ||  || 2-6-0 ||  || 200 hp || E 91, Vale de Vouga, Comboios de Portugal, Portugal
|-
| 5757 || 1913 ||  || 2-6-0 ||  || 200 hp || E 97, Vale de Vouga, Comboios de Portugal, Portugal
|-
| 5805 || 1912 ||  || 0-6-0 ||  || 90 hp || No  201 of Japanese government railways, later LCK 31 of the Taiwaneses government railway, now plinthed in Hualien, Taiwan
|-
| 5744 || 1912 ||  || 0-4-0 ||  || || Initially Obras de Irrigacion del Territoria del Rio Negro, later Moño Azul, near Vista Alegre Sur and Centenario, Neuquén, Argentina, now Rebecca, Devon Railway Centre, Bickleigh, Devon, England
|-
| 5829 || 1913 ||  || 0-4-0 ||  || 50 hp || Train de Rillé
|-
| 5834 || 1913 ||  || 0-4-0 || || 20 hp || No 11, P C Allen, weight: 5.57 tonnes. Was in service at a Solvay Alkali Plant in Torrelavega, Spain. Named after the chairman of ICI from 1968 to 1971, who was a light railway enthusiast and instigated the rescue of this locomotive. Now Leighton Buzzard Light Railway.
|-
| 5856 || 1912 ||  ||  0-8-0 ||  || 60 hp || Olean 1, PG Olean, Situbondo, Indonesia
|-
| 5857 || 1912 ||  || 0-8-0 ||  || 60 hp || Sumberharjo 2, PG Sumberharjo, Pemalang, Indonesia
|-
| 5859 || 1912 ||  || 0-8-0 ||  || 60 hp || Pesantren 9, PG Pesantren Baru, Kediri, Indonesia
|-
| 5885 || 1912 ||  || 0-4-0 ||  || 40 hp || Johoku Kotsu Park, Itabashi, Tokio, Japan
|-
| 5933 || 1913 ||  || || || || Putte verkehrte von 1914 bis 1934 zwischen Båven und dem Likstammen-See (Båven–Likstammen Järnväg, Axalabanan), Sweden
|-
| 5990 || 1912 ||  ||originally 0-4-0T, later 0-4-2T ||  || 60 hp || Sold in 1912 to Decauville São Paulo (as an agent or reseller), later Craig & Martin Brasil, later Estrada de Ferro Perus – Pirapora – EFPP No. 8 (chemin de fer de Cimento Portland Perus – Cajamar), later converted to 0-6-2, now LP Assessoria Industrial e Restaurações Ltda. – Votorantim, SPEFPP (CBCPP) No. 10, Perus, Brazil.
|-
| 6008 || 1912 ||  || 0-4-4-0 Mallet ||  || 60 hp || Candi 6, Sidoarjo, Indonesia
|-
| 6320 || 1913 ||  ||  0-6-0 || || || Elza, former Zrenjanin Sugar locomotive, at Mokra Gora
|-
|  ||   ||  || 0-4-0 ||  || || The US army conficated the German locomotive in World War I near Abainville in France and appplied the lettering U.S.A. X6023 (but this was not O&k 6023, which was a 0-8-0+T, for sugar mill Tjoekir, Java)
|-
| 6024 ||  ||  || 0-4-4-0 Mallet ||  || || Cia. Minera Penoles-Avalos, Mexiko
|-
| 6039 || 1912 ||  || 0-8-0 ||  || 60 hp || Purwodadi 11, PG Purwodadi, Ngawi, Indonesia
|-
| 6389 || 1913 ||  || 0-8-0 ||  || 80 hp || Tasik Madu III, Solo, Java, Indonesia
|-
| 5896 und 5897 || 1912 ||  || 0-8-0 ||  ||  || Nybergs Gruv AB 1 and Nybergs Gruv AB 2, Nyberget Morgårdshammar (Nybergets Järnväg NJ, Nybergs Gruv - Avesta Jernverks AB), Sweden
|-
| 5896 und 5897 || 1912 ||  || 0-8-0 ||  ||  || Nybergs Gruv AB 1 and Nybergs Gruv AB 2, Nyberget Morgårdshammar (Nybergets Järnväg NJ, Nybergs Gruv - Avesta Jernverks AB), Sweden
|-
| 6126 || 1913 ||  || 0-4-0 || || || Hällefors Bruk, No. 6
|-
| 6519 || 1913 ||  || 0-4-0 ||  || 10 hp || Sold via Decauville to the South Australian Irrigation and Reclamation Department in Pompoota on the Murray River
|-
| 6520 || 1913 ||  || 0-4-0 ||  || 10 hp ||  Sold via Decauville to the South Australian Irrigation and Reclamation Department in Pompoota on the Murray River.
|-
| 6533 || 1913 ||  || 0-4-0 ||   || 50 hp || Initially Mitsui Bussan Kaisha, Kobe, now Igasa Railway, Okayama, Japan
|-
| 6559 || 1914 ||  || 0-8-0 ||  || || Société Sucrière de Pithiviers, Sermaises, second from left in the photo
|-
| 6603 || ||  || 0-4-0 || || 20 hp || Ezeiza, Argentina
|-
| 6620 || 1913 ||  || 0-4-0 ||  || 20 hp || Lotta 1 Östra Södermanlands Järnväg
|-
| 6625 || 1913||  ||  || 0-4-0T || || Joh. Köppe, Bitterfeld, Finkenherd, Strabag, later Museum Prof. Dr. Bandtlow, Passau, preserved as Monika N° 3 at Besucherbergwerk Fortuna, Solms-Oberbiel, Germany
|-
| 6641 || 1913 ||  || 0-4-0 ||  || 30 hp || Montalban, West Lancashire Light Railway
|-
| 6760 || 1913 ||  || 0-4-0 || 
||  || Initially gas and electricity works, Stockholm, since 1918 Stockholm 5 at Stockholms Stads Lantegandomsnämnd, since 1933 Smöjens Kalkbrott 4, ausgemustert 1956.
|-
| 6763 || 1914 ||  || || || || Gypsum mines at Reisdorf in Luxemburg
|-
| 6770 || 1914 ||  || 0-4-0 ||  || 40 hp || Smedjebacken, Sweden
|-
| 6805 || 1914 ||  || 0-4-0 || || || Millaquin Mill, Bundaberg, Queensland
|-
| 6937 || 1914 ||  || 1'0-4-0 ||  || 30 hp || Purwodadi 3, PG Purwodadi, Ngawi, Indonesia
|-
| 6944 || 1913 ||  || 0-8-0 ||  || 100 hp || Purwodadi 5, PG Purwodadi, Ngawi, Indonesia
|-
| 6946 || 1913 ||  || 0-8-0 ||  || 60 hp || Kedawung 14, PG Kedawung, Pasuruan, Indonesia
|-
| 6962 || 1913 ||  || 0-4-0 ||  || 20 hp || Valdés Vergara der Fleischverpackungsfabrik Bories, 4 km von Puerto Natales in Chile. Sie wurde 1915 von der Sociedad Explotadora de Tierra del Fuego gekauft. Sie wurde für die Ausstellung im Museum des Hotels The Singular Patagonia in den alten Industrieanlagen in Puerto Bories restauriert.
|-
| 6976 || 1913 ||  || 0-4-2||  || 30 hp || Tasik Madu XV, Solo Java, Indonesia
|-
| 7063 || 1915 ||  || 0-6-0 ||   || || Forest railwayy Rečkov
|-
| 7067 ||  ||  || 0-6-0 ||  || 30 hp || Bakrie Sumatera Plantations Railway, Bunut, Kecamatan Kota Kisaran Barat, Kabupaten Asahan, Sumatera Utara, Indonesia
|-
| 7086 || 1914 ||  || 0-4-0 ||  || || Tove. Geliefert an Ramseyer & Brechtbühler, Rubigen, Schweiz. Verkauft 1918 an die Baufirma Wright, Thomsen & Kier. Brabrand 1956.
|-
| 7194 || 1914 ||  || 0-6-0 ||  || || Initially Harbour of the fort of Reval, Tallinn, later military railway on Kirkkomaa Island, Kotka, since 1946 paper mill Äänenkoski, decommissioned in 1964, plinthed since 1982, Äänekoski Selluloosatehdas, Äänekoski, Finland
|-
| 7150 || 1914 ||  || 0-4-4-0 Mallet || || || La France bei Haudainville, beschlagnahmt bei der Firma Rondant & Demenois.
|-
| 7300 || 1915 ||  || 0-6-0 ||  || || Lotta, Nr. 2, Lindfors-Bosjöns Järnväg
|-
| 7429 || 1914 ||  || 0-6-0 ||  || 50 hp || Chemin de fer des Chanteraines
|-
| 7443 || 1919 ||  || 0-4-0 ||  || 50 hp || Nr. 3 Dylta, Östra Södermanlands Järnväg
|-
| 7459 || 1921 ||  || 0-6-0 ||  || || Erst De Danske Hedeselskab, Jllan, heute Hedelands Veteranbane, Høje-Taastrup Kommune, Dänemark
|-
| 7479 || 1918 ||  || 0-4-0 ||  || 30 hp || Lukas, initially gravel pit Kissingen near Augsburg, later Schinznach-Dorf, Baumschulbahn (orchard railway), Converted into a tram engine
|-
| 7610 || 1918 ||  || 0-4-0 ||  || || Initially Kalk- u Mergelwerke Heinrich Möller, now Eisenbahnmuseum Bochum
|-
|| 7642 || 1922 ||  || 0-6-0 || 762 mm || || Initially Towada Railway & Co., Sanbongi-machi, Schi-no-hara, later Izumo, Ōigawa Tetsudō, Japan
|-
| 7696 || 1919 ||  || 0-4-0 || 643 mm || || № 5, Karolina, Delary-Strömsnäsbruks Järnväg, Sweden
|-
| 7697 || 1920 ||  || 0-4-0 ||  || || Bromberger Kreisbahn
|-
| || 1920 ||  || ||  || || O&K No. 12, Bañoles, Palamós–Girona–Banyoles railway. They had six O&K-Lokomotiven, which had been built in 1910 for a contractor in Belgium. Five of these were davon 0-4-0 and one was 0-4-2. They were numbered 11 to 16 and were called Andrea, Bañoles, Celrá, Cornellá, Mercedes and Gerona.
|-
|  || ca 1920 ||  || 0-4-0 || || ca 20 hp ||
|-
| 7729 || 1914 ||  || 0-6-0 ||  || 140 hp || Basaltine, initially Basalt AG, Linz am Rhein, later playground at Bad Godesberg, now Rheinisches Industriebahn-Museum, Cologne, Germany
|-
| 7325 || 1920 ||  || 0-6-0 ||  || || Ojakkala–Olkkala railway, now heritage railway in Kowjoki, Finland
|-
| 7446 || 1916 ||  || 0-4-0 ||  || 40 hp || Lotte, Phönix Stahlwerk, J. C. Bleckmann, Hönigsberg, Austria
|-
| 7769 || 1918 ||  ||  ||  (Swedish 3 ft gauge) || || Stockholm–Roslagens Järnvägar No. 33 († 1946)
|-
| 7899 || 1921 ||  || 0-4-0 ||  || || Zakłady Starachowickie 9, Starachowice, Polen
|-
| 7875 || 1914 ||  || 0-8-0 ||  || 70 hp || Pangka 9, PG Pangka, Slawi near Tegal, Indonesia
|-
| 7878 || 1914 ||  || 0-8-0 ||  || 70 hp || Gempolkerep 11, Mojokerto, Indonesia
|-
| || 1914 ||  ||D h2t || ||  || Oberschlesische Schmalspurbahn, Prussian T 38, Kattowitz 211 to 37, DR 99 411–421, 32,25 t
|-
| || ca 1914 ||  || C'1 n2t ||  || || Ferrocarril Argentino del Norte
|-
| || ca 1919 ||  || E h2 ||  || || Oberschlesische Schmalspurbahn, Prussian T 39, gear-driven rear axles, System Luttermöller
|-
| 7900 || 1921 ||  || 0-4-0 ||  || || Narrow gauge railway Rogów–Biała Rawska 
|-
| 7908 || 1917 ||  || 0-6-0 ||  || || Heeresfeldbahn No 508 B, 99.3-016, Baba Milka, Niš, Serbia
|-
| 7961 || 1917 ||  || 0-8-0 || (Swedish 3 ft gauge) || || Bahnstrecke Nordmark–Klarälven, Sweden
|-
| 7999 || 1914  ||  || 0-8-0 ||  || || Heeresfeldbahn Brigadelok No 482, depot administration of the 1. Eb-Brigade, Rehagen-Klausdorf (am Mellensee), later Polish State Railways PKP No 4232, since 1945 No ML 631 Latvian Railways LVD, since 1994 No ML 631, Museum of Maritime Fishing, Ventspils, Lithuania
|-
| 8065 || 1916 ||  || 0-6-0 ||  || || Initially Rotterdamsche Tramweg Maatschappij № 54, Hellevoetsluis, now Rotterdamsche Tramweg Museum RTM, Ouddorp, Netherlands
|-
| 8083 || 1915 ||  || 0-4-0 ||  || || Tramway de Pithiviers à Toury and Chemin de fer Froissy-Dompierre
|-
| 8090 || 1916 ||  || 0-8-0 ||  ||  1000 hp || Rejosari 10 Salak, PG Rejosari, Madiun, Indonesia
|-
| 8165 || 1916 ||  || 0-6-0 ||  || || Initially WKD 66, later Ty3-1162, Museum Sochaczew
|-
|| 8271 || 1916 ||  || Dn2t ||  || || Depot administration of the 1. Eb-Brigade, Rehagen-Klausdorf (am Mellensee) "853", since 1920 4CL-5 or ML 629 Latvian Railways LVD, since 1994 im agricultural museum Talsi, Latvia
|-
| 8285 || 1917 ||  || 0-8-0 ||  || || Initially Thalbahn Habsheim, later Tramway de Pithiviers à Toury No. 5-3, now Chemin de fer Froissy-Dompierre
|-
|| 8293 || 1916 ||  ||  0-6-0 || 700 mm || 70 hp || Initially Dononbahn, later Waldeisenbahn Alberschweiler, later Lambert Freres, Cormeilles-en-Parisis, now Stoomtrein Katwijk Leiden
|-
| 8418 || 1917 ||  || 0-6-0 || Initially , since 1919  || ||  Depot administration of the 1. Eb-Brigade, Rehagen-Klausdorf (am Mellensee) No 487, since 1919 Hungarian forest railway No 357.305, later plinthed, saw mill Lenti, sice 1996 plinthed at saw mill Csömödér
|-
| 8500 || 1918 ||  ||  ||  || || Mariska, Goods railway station Dúbrava (now Vysoká pri Morave zastávka), Zohor–Záhorská Ves railway, Slovakia
|-
| 8575 || 1918 ||  || 0-8-0 ||  || || Nr. 1958, Depot administration of the 1. Eb-Brigade, Rehagen-Klausdorf (am Mellensee), later Tx 1958 Polish forest administration ZKL, forest railway Hajnowka, since 1987 railway museum Sochaczew, Poland
|-
| 8590 || 1918 ||  || 0-8-0 ||  || 65 hpi  || Tx 1113, Płociczno, Poland
|-
|  || 1918 ||  || 0-8-0 ||  || 65 hpi  || Tx 1114, Czarna Białostocka, Poland
|-
| 8594 || 1918 ||  ||  0-8-0 ||  || 70 hp || Initially T.P. Ruvenhorst & Humbert, now Association pour la préservation et l'entretien du matériel à voie étroite, Saint-Germain-d'Arcé, France
|-
| 8627 || 1918 ||  ||  0-8-0 ||  || 70 hp || Initially Heeresfeldbahn Brigadelok No. 13, later Sucreries Coucy-le-Château, now Chemin de fer Froissy-Dompierre
|-
| 8718 || 1918 ||  || 0-10-0 ||  || || Heeresfeldbahn No 2643 with outer frame and Luttermöller rear axles
|-
| 8734 || 1918 ||  || 0-10-0 ||  || || T914, sugar mill San Martin del Tabacal in Salta, Argentina
|-
|  || ca 1919 ||  || 0-4-0 ||  || || 5,4 t, heated by wood or coal
|-
|  || ca 1919 ||  || 0-6-0 ||  || || 10,2 t, heated by wood or coal
|-
|  || ca 1919 ||  || 0-4-0 || 900– || || 20 t
|-
|  || ca 1919 ||  || 0-8-0 ||  || 110 hp || 21 t
|-
| || ca 1919 ||  || || || || Egypt
|-
| || ca 1919 ||  || || || || Chemin de fer de Zambezia, Mozambique
|-
| 9147 || 1919 ||  || 0-6-0 ||  ||  || Cement factory Klagshamn, Sweden
|-
| 9103 || 1920 ||  || 0-8-0 ||  || 60 hp || Rejosari 6 Arjuna, PG Rejosari, Madiun, Indonesia
|-
| 9193 || 1920 ||  || 0-6-0 ||  || || Erst Rotterdamsche Tramweg Maatschappij № 56, Hellevoetsluis, heute Rotterdamsche Tramweg Museum RTM, Ouddorp, Netherlands
|-
| 9199 || 1920 ||  || 0-6-0 || || || Hällefors Bruk, No. 8, Sweden
|-
| 9244 || 1925 ||  || 0-4-0 ||  || 40 hp || Frankfurter Feldbahnmuseum No 18
|-
| 9307 || 1920 ||  || 0-8-0 ||  || 60 hp || Gempolkerep 18, Mojokerto, Indonesia
|-
| 9308 || 1920 ||  || 0-8-0 ||  || 70 hp || Gempolkerep 2, Mojokerto, Indonesia
|-
| 9309 || 1920 ||  || 0-8-0 ||  || 60 hp || Purwodadi 15, PG Purwodadi, Ngawi, Indonesia
|-
| 9310 || 1920 ||  || 0-8-0 ||  || 70 hp || Wonolangan 3, PG Wonolangan, Probolinggo, Indonesia
|-
| 9349 || 1920 ||  || 0-8-0 ||  || 90 hp || Tulungagung 2, Mojopanggung, Java, Indonesia
|-
| 9356 || 1920 ||  || 0-8-0 ||  || 60PS || Kebonagung 10,  PG Kebonagung, Malang, Indonesia
|-
| 9358 || 1920 ||  || 0-8-0 ||  || 60 hp || Olean 5, PG Olean, Situbondo, Indonesia
|-
| 9382 || 1920 ||  || 0-8-0 ||  || 80 hp || Prajekan 3, jetzt Asembagus 3,  Asembagus, Situbondo Indonesia
|-
| 9412 || 1920 ||  || 0-8-0 ||  || 60 hp || Asembagus 5, Asembagus, Situbondo Indonesia
|-
| 9418 || 1920 ||  || 0-6-0 ||  ||  || KJI Nr. 23, Nr. 99 4301, Kleinbahnen des Kreises Jerichow I
|-
| 9429 || 1920 ||  || 0-8-0 ||  || 60 hp || Purwodadi 1II, PG Purwodadi, Ngawi, Indonesia
|-
| 9430 || 1920 ||  || 0-8-0 ||  || 60 hp || Pagottan 3, PG Pagottan, Madiun, Indonesia
|-
| 9447 || 1910 ||  || 0-8-0 ||  || 80 hp || Kanigoro 5, PG Kanigoro, Madiun, Indonesia
|-
| 9550 and 9551 || 1921 ||  || 0-6-0 ||  || || Oficina Peña Chica, Tarapacá Region, Chile
|-
| 9454 || 1921 ||  || 1D ||  || || № 7 Loviisa-Vesijärvi railway, now Jokioinen Museum Railway, Finland
|-
| 9459 || 1920 ||  || 0-6-0 ||  ||  || Initially De Maas 3, now Asembagus 11,  Asembagus, Situbondo, Indonesia
|-
| 9468 || 1921 ||  || 0-8-0, Luttermöller || || || Usina Santa Terezinha No. 14, Água Preta, Brazil
|-
| 9685 || 1922 || || 0-6-2 ||  || || Initially Lok II of Staatliche Waldbahn Ruhpolding–Reit im Winkl, since 1940 Kleinbahn Leer–Aurich–Wittmund 14
|-
| 9704 || 1921 ||  || 0-4-0 ||  || 40 hp  || Semboro 6, PG Semboro, Jember, Java, Indonesia
|-
| 9752 || 1921 ||  || || || || Wakataka, Diorama Kyoto, Japan
|-
| 9785 || 1921 ||  || 0-6-0 ||  || || Delivered to sugar factoriy Sobbowitz (785mm gauge), Ty 9785 of the sugar mill Gryfice, now exhibited at Pommersche Schmalspurbahnen in Gryfice
|-  Pokropiński="???"
| 9881 || 1921 ||  || 0-4-0 ||  || 40 hp  || I, Zuckerfabrik PG Tasik Madu, I, Solo, Java, Indonesia
|-
| 9906 || 1922 ||  || 0-8-0 ||  || 150 hp || Kebonagung 7, PG Kebonagung, Malang, Indonesia
|-
| 9998 || || || ||  || || Elouise, initially Matas Nacionais, Portugal, now Old Kiln Light Railway at Rural Life Living Museum in Tilford, near Farnham, Surrey
|-
| 10145 || 1922 ||  || 0-4-0 ||  || 20 hp || Stoomtrein Katwijk Leiden
|-
| 10154 || 1922 ||  || 0-6-0 ||  || 90 hp || Zreče, Slovenia. Nos 10151–10180 were delivered to the SHS state railways (State of Slovenes, Croats and Serbs, later Kingdom of Yugoslavia) as German World War I reparations.
|-
| 10155 || 1922 ||  || 0-6-0T || || || Jugoslovenske Železnice, No 11034, JDŽ 71-014
|-
| 10156 || 1922 ||  || 0-6-0 ||  || || Initially O-VIII, later SHS 3006, Jesenice Ironworks, later stored at Upper Sava Valley Museum, Jesenice, Slovenia
|-
| 10157–10177 || 1922 || || 0-6-0 ||  ||  || Jugoslovenske Železnice, Nos 11021–11042, JDŽ 71-001 to 71-013 and 71-015 to 71-022
|-
| 10168 || 1922 ||  || 0-6-0 ||  || ||  Initially O-IX, later 71-012, Slovenian Railway Museum, Ljubljana operational, in use at Zreče, Slovenia
|-
| 10261 || 1921 ||  || 0-6-0T+T ||  || 50 hp || Lolita, built for Alfonso Pasquel, La Orduña Sugar Mill, Coatepec, Veracruz, Mexico
|-
| 10286 || 1926 ||  || 0-8-0 ||  || 90 hp || Merican 7, PG Merican, Kediri, Indonesia
|-
| 10309 || 1922 ||  || 0-6-0 ||  || 30 hp || Pulau Raja 2, Pulau Raja (PTP VI), Indonesia
|-
| 10372 || 1922 ||  || 0-8-0 ||  || 90 hp || Pesantren 8, PG Pesantren Baru, Kediri, Indonesia
|-
| 10442 || 1923 ||  || 0-8-0 ||  || 150 hp || Pagottan 8, PG Pagottan, Madiun, Indonesia
|-
| 10443 || 1923 ||  || 0-8-0 ||  || 60 hp || Gempolkerep 3L, Mojokerto, Indonesia
|-
| 10458 || 1923 ||  || 0-8-0||  || 70 hp || Wonolangan 6, PG Wonolangan, Probolinggo, Indonesia
|-
| 10462 || 1921 ||  || 0-8-0 ||  || 80 hp ||  Tasik Madu V, Solo Java, Indonesia
|-
| 10497 || 1922 ||  || 0-8-2T || || || Caminho de Ferro de Luanda, Angola, Nº 61, Classe 60
|-
| 10499 || 1925 ||  || 0-8-2T || || || Caminho de Ferro de Moçâmedes, Angola, Nº 68, Classe 60
|-
| 10501 || 1923 ||  || 0-8-0 ||  || 170 hpi || KJI Nr. 15 der Kleinbahnen des Kreises Jerichow IO&K 10501 - DR "99 4644-3"
|-
| 10542 || 1923 ||  || 0-6-0 ||  || || CFR 763.148, delivered via subsidiary in Budapest an Căile Ferate Forestiere (governmental forest railways) geliefert, now railway museum Sibiu (Hermannstadt), Romania
|-
| 10548 || 1923 ||  || 0-6-0 || 600mm || || Erst Kungl Domänstyrelsen, Askekärr works, Stockholm, since 1937 Malma–Haggården railway, Kinnekleva, ca 1939 Nya Asfalt AB, ca 1942 Avesta Jernverks AB, since 1963 plinthed at Avesta, later Nr. 10, Avesta, Östra Södermanlands Järnväg
|-
| 10550 || 1923 ||  || || || || Forest railway in Sweden
|-
| 10591 || 1923 ||  || 0-8-0 ||  || 60 hp || Sindanglaut 13, PG Sindanglaut 13, Cirebon Java, Indonesia
|-
| 10606 || 1923 ||  || 0-10-0 ||  || 120 hp || Pagottan 6, PG Pagottan, Madiun, Indonesia
|-
| || 1930 and 1934 ||  || 0-8-0 ||  ||  || Nr. 10II to 12II of Mecklenburg-Pommersche Schmalspurbahn (MPSB)
|-
| 10607 || 1934 ||  || 0-8-0 ||  || 150 hp || Gempolkerep 12, Mojokerto, Indonesia
|-
| 10660 || 1923 ||  || 0-6-0 ||  || || Sugar mill La Poveda in Arganda del Rey near Madrid, Spain
|-
| 10726 || 1923 |||| 0-6-0 ||  || || Via subsidiary in Budapest to Wenkheim farm, Mosonszentmiklós, Ungarn, later Hungarian State Railways, forest railway Csömödér No 357.314, finally (shown at the front) Széchenyi-Museumsbahn, Nagycenk, Ungarn
|-
| 10738 || 1924 ||  || 0-8-0 ||  || 80 hp || Wringinanom 2, PG Wringinanom, Situbondo, Indonesia
|-
| 10739 || 1924 ||  || 0-8-0 ||  || 80 hp || Tasik Madu IV, Solo Java,  Indonesia
|-
| 10740 || 1923 ||  || B1 n2t|| || || Merican 5, PG Merican, Kediri, Indonesia
|-
| 10750 || 1923 ||  || 0-6-0+t ||  || || Initially Sragi 14 Max, now Statfold Barn Railway
|-
| 10808 || 1924 ||  || 0-6-0 ||  || 90 hp || No. 6 Pedemoura was used in the Duero valley in Portugal, to transport coal from the Minas de Pejao to a jetty on the river. Now preserved on the Leighton Buzzard Light Railway.
|-
| 10844 || 1924 ||  || 0-8-0 ||  || || Trusetal of Trusebahn
|-
| 10857 || 1924 ||  || 0-6-0WT || ||  || Companhia do Assúcar de Angola, Fazenda S. Francisco, Dombe Grande, Nº 6
|-
| 10891  || 1925 ||  || 0-8-0 ||  || || Tulungagung 3, Mojopanggung, Java, Indonesia
|-
| 10903 || 1925 ||  || 0-4-0 ||  || 90 hp || Kinder was used by Lehane McKenzie & Shand Ltd in the construction of the Fernilee reservoir in the Peak District of England 
|-
| 10914 || 1924 ||  || 0-6-0T ||  || 90 hp || Sugar Factory Zbiersk 4
|-
| 10922 || 1925 ||  || ||  || || Kaijima class 32 at Nogata Coal Mine Museum
|-
| 10956 || 1925 ||  || 0-10-0 ||  || || SMT T-907, sugar mill Ingenio San Martin del Tabacal in Argentina. Now on a private field near Sheffield, United Kingdom
|-
| 11007 || 1925 ||  || 0-6-0 ||  || ||Py4-741, Sochaczew, Poland
|-
| 11037 || 1925 ||  || 0-6-0 || || || Polnische Schmalspurbahnen, Typ 3-191. Pińczówer Kleinbahn (Świętokrzyska Kolej Dojazdowa).Ulrich Thorhauer : Świętokrzyska Kolejka Dojazdowa - 600/750 mm. Früherer Name: Jedrzejowska KD..
|-
| 11073 || 1925 ||  || 0-10-0 ||  || 90 hp || Frankfurter Feldbahnmuseum Lok Nr. 16
|-
| 11262 || 1926 ||  ||  0-4-4-0 Mallet ||  || 60 hp || Semboro 15, Zuckerfabrik PG Semboro, Jember, Java, Indonesia
|-
| 11139 || 1926 ||  || 0-8-0 ||  || 110 hp || Pagottan 7, PG Pagottan, Madiun, Indonesia
|-
| 11142 || 1927 ||  || 0-8-0 ||  || 90 hp || Gempolkerep 19, Mojokerto, Indonesia
|-
| 11277 || 1926 ||  || 0-4-4-0 Mallet ||  || 60 hp || Asembagus 17, Asembagus, Situbondo, Indonesia
|-
| 11293 || 1926 ||  || 0-6-0 ||  || 225 hp || Semboro 1, Jember, Java, Indonesia
|-
| 11735 || 1928 ||  || Bn2t ||  || 50 hp || Initially Steenfabriek IJsseloord near Arnhem, now Stoomloc 6 at Stoomtrein Katwijk Leiden Netherlands
|-
| 11788 || 1929 || || 0-8-0 ||  ||  ||  Phosphat-Eisenbahn beim Dorf Vaitepaua auf der Insel MakateaMusterlok - O&K 4028/1910.
|-
| 11309 || 1927 ||  || 0-8-0 ||  || 90 hp || Initially Company Azucarera Conception, Argentina. 2008 Preston Services, GB. 2019 to Böhmetalbahn, Walsrode, Germany.
|-
| 11348 || 1927 ||  || 0-8-0 ||  || 70 hp ||  Merican 8, PG Merican, Kediri Indonesia
|-
| 11350 || 1927 ||  || 0-4-4-0Kitson-Meyer ||  || || Ferrocarril Militar de Puente Alto al Volcán
|-
|| 11368 || 1928 ||  || 0-4-0 ||  || || Lepra-Heilanstalt auf der  Isla del Cerrito in Argentina
|-
| 11550 || 1927 ||  || 0-8-0 ||  || 90 hp || Kebonagung 5, PG Kebonagung, Malang, Indonesia
|-
| 11563 || 1928 ||  || 0-8-0 ||  || 110 hp || Rejosari 11 Gedek, PG Rejosari, Madiun, Indonesia
|-
| 11603 || 1928 ||  || 0-8-0 ||  || 60 hp || Sindanglaut 12, Zuckerfabrik PG Sindanglaut 12, Cirebon, Java, Indonesia
|-
| 11638 || 1928 ||  || 0-8-0 ||  || 150 hp || Gempolkerep 4, Mojokerto, Indonesia
|-
| 11648 || 1928  ||  || 0-4-0 || 700 mm || || Veenpark, Barger-Compascuum (Gemeinde Emmen), Netherlands
|-
| 11684 ||  ||  || 0-4-0 ||  || || Stoomtrein Katwijk Leiden
|-
| 11927  || 1928 ||  || C fl ||  ||  || Semboro 3, Jember, Java, Indonesia
|-
| 11198 || 1926 ||  || 0-4-0 ||  || || Tren de Arganda bei Madrid
|-
| 11695 || 1928 ||  || 0-4-0 ||  || || Le Petit Train de la Baie de Saint-Brieuc, Association des chemins de fer des Côtes-du-Nord
|-
| 11591 || 1928 ||  || 0-4-0 ||  || || Stoomtrein Katwijk Leiden
|-
| || ca 1928 ||  || 2-6-0 ||  ||  || 22 t, Saigon–Mỹ Tho railway, Vietnam

|-
| 11990 || 1929 ||  ||  0-6-0 fl || 750 mm || || Fireless locomotive, Äänekoski–Suolahti railway, Minkiö narrow gauge railway museum
|-
| 12203 || 1933 ||  || 0-4-0 ||  || 50 hp || Tulangan 5 Mojopahit, scrap heap at CV Tersana Baru, Kediri, Indonesia
|-
| 12246 || 1933 ||  || 0-4-0 ||  || 50 hp || Yvonne, initially Steenfabriek Rijswijk Netherlands, later Eerste Drentse Vereniging van Stoomliefhebber EDS, Museum Veenpark
|-
| 12247 || 1911 ||  || Bn2t || 700 mm || 50 hp || Sawit Seberang 6 (früher 7), Sumatra, Indonesia
|-
| 12262 || 1931 ||  || 0-4-0 ||  || || Rendeng 08,  PG Gondang Baru, Klaten, Indonesia
|-
| 12331 || 1931 ||  || 0-6-0 ||  || || Sub Nigel Gold Mines No. 3 in Dunnattar, Transvaal, South Africa
|-
| 12350 || 1906 ||  || 0-6-0 ||  || 135 hpi  ||  Prignitzer Kreiskleinbahnen  No. 22, 99 4504; scrapped in 1966
|-
| 12375 || 1932 ||  || 0-8-0 ||  || 90 hp || Pangka 10, PG Pangka, Slawi bei Tegal
|-
| 12388 || 1932 ||  || 0-6-0 || Initially ; later  || || Initially Beau Sejour Estate, Mauritius, now L'Aventure du Sucre, Beau Plan, near Pamplemousses, Mauritius 
|-
| 12400 || 1932 ||  || 2-8-2 ||  || || DR 99 2321-0, Bäderbahn Molli, Germany
|-
| 12401 || 1932 ||  || 2-8-2 || 900 mm || || DR 99 2322-8, Bäderbahn Molli, Germany
|-
| 12402 || 1932 ||  || 2-8-2 || 900 mm || || DR 99 2323-6, Bäderbahn Molli, Germany 
|-
| 12435 || 1933 ||  || 0-4-0 ||  || 50 hp ||  Tulangan 2 Sriwijaya, Kediri, scrap metal merchant CV Tersana Baru, ex PG Tulangan, Sidoarjo Indonesia
|-
| 12493 || 1934 ||  || 0-6-0 || 500 mm || 30 hp || Initially sugar factory in Angola, now Feldbahn-Museum 500, Nuremberg, 
|-
| 12503 || 1934  ||  ||Initially 0-4-0, later 2-4-0 ||  || || Peter Büscher & Sohn, construction company, Münster, now No 43 heritage railway at Silver Dollar City, Missouri, United States
|-
| 12350 || 1931 ||  || ||  || || Initially MBB No. 9II, now Yekaterinburg children railway
|-
|12493 || 1934 ||  || 0-6-0WT || || || Companhia de Assúcar de Angola, Fazenda Tentativa, Caxito, Angola, Nº 7
|-
| 12518 || 1934 ||  || 0-8-0 ||  || || MPSB 12, 99 3462, Dampf-Kleinbahn Mühlenstroth, No. 12, Mecklenburg|-
| 12536 || 1934 ||  || 0-4-0WT || || || Companhia de Assúcar de Angola, Fazenda Tentativa, Caxito, Angola, Nº 8
|-
| 12595 || 1935 ||  || 0-4-0 ||  || || T1-009, Narrow Gauge Railway Museum in Wenecja, Poland
|-
|  12643 || 1935 ||  || ||  || || Lundebanen
|-
| 12722 || 1936||  || || || || Bredgar and Wormshill Light Railway
|-
| 12740 || 1936 ||  || ||  || || In use until 1971 at Likomba Development Company, Cameroon, Africa, wood-fired, with a spark arrestor, now Elf, Leighton Buzzard Light Railway switched to coal
|-
| 12782 || 1936 ||  || 0-6-0 ||  || || Initially Åminnefors Railway, Pohja, later Jokioinen Railway, Finland
|-
| 12861 || 1936 ||  || 0-4-0 || || || Trelew in Chubut, Argentina
|-
| 12791 || 1936 ||  || 0-6-0 || 800 mm || || Medine Estate, now Casela Bird Park, Cascavelle, Mauritius
|-
| 12805 || 1936 ||  || 0-4-0 ||  || || Berliner Parkeisenbahn, Oberschöneweide, Germany
|-
| 12814 || 1936 ||  || 0-6-0 ||  || 40 hp || Gunung Malayu 01, Gunung Malayu, PT Lonsum Sumatra, Indonesia
|-
| 12900 || 1937 ||  || 0-4-0 ||  || || Initially Bungenäs, since 1951 Smöjens Kalkbrott 5 since 1964 in a museum in Gotland
|-
| 12974 || 1937 ||  || ||  || || Stoomtrein Katwijk Leiden
|-
| 13088 || 1937 ||  || 0-4-0T ||  (Swedish 3 ft gauge) || 50 hp || Kullgrens Enka AB, Uddevalla, Sweden, initially preserved at Museum Uddevalla, now preserved at Hjo harbour, Sweden
|-
| 13021 || 1937 ||  || 0-6-0 || 920mm || 160 hp || SA Belge des Mines d'Aljustrel, Aljustrel, Portugal

|-
| 13103 || 1938 ||  || 0-4-0 ||  || 110 hp || Quarz-Susi, Quarzwerke, Frechen, Bachem/Frechen, now Rheinisches Industriebahn-Museum, Cologne, Germany
|-
| 13118 || 1938 ||  || 0-8-0 ||  || 90 hp || Jatibarang 12, PG Jatibarang, Tegal, Indonesia
|-
| 13165 || 1938 ||  || 0-4-0 ||  || 70 hp || Deinste 9, Dossenheim quarries, Porphywerk Altvatter & Co, Dossenheim, later Witten-Bommern, Zeche Nachtigall coal mine
|-
| 13168 || 1939 ||  || Initially 0-4-0, later 2-4-0 ||  || 70 hp || A31034/1, Müller-Altvater Co. construction company, Stuttgart, later Northfield & Cannon Valley Railroad in Northfield, Minnesota, now № 13 ,  heritage railway at Silver Dollar City, Missouri, United States
|-
| 13169 || 1939 ||  || 0-4-0 ||  || 70 hp || A31034/2, Müller-Altvater Co. construction company, Stuttgart, later Northfield & Cannon Valley Railroad in Northfield, Minnesota, now № 14, heritage railway at Silver Dollar City, Missouri, United States
|-
| 13177 || 1939 ||  || || || ||  
|-
| 13306 to 13308 || 1939 ||  || 0-4-4-0, C'C' h4t, Kitson Meyer ||  || 310 PSI, 250 PSE || DR 99 1641 to DR 99 1643, later PKP Tyyl-691 to Tyyl-693 
|-
| || ca 1940 ||  || || || || Overburden locomotive
|-
| 13571 || 1941 ||  || 0-4-0 ||  || 110 hp|| Dollart (BorkumIII), Borkumer Kleinbahn
|}

External links

 
   
  With web links to 50 photos.
 
 379 F. 3d 1227 — Ungaro-Benages v. Dresdner Bank AG at OpenJurist—U.S. Federal court case, wherein Benno Orenstein's great-great-granddaughter sued Dresdner Bank and Deutsche Bank to recover her family's share of O&K taken under Aryanisation.
 

 Literature 
 Roland Bude, Klaus Fricke and Martin Murray: O&K-Dampflokomotiven : Lieferverzeichnis 1892–1945.'' Verlag Railroadiana, Buschhoven 1978, . (Partial reprint of an Orenstein & Koppel publication)
 Delivery lists of the locomotive works at werkbahn.de (nominal charge)

References

Locomotive manufacturers of Germany
Escalator manufacturers
Manufacturing companies based in Berlin
Articles containing video clips
Companies acquired from Jews under Nazi rule
Railway locomotive-related lists